Raygun were a British band formerly signed to RCA Records.

History
The Adj, former guitarist indie rock band Kubb, met lead singer Ray Gun studying Music Technology in Guildford. The two began writing songs and performing around Surrey and London, putting on live music events under the name 'Raygun and the Adjitators'.
The duo recruited the help of bass player Ben and drummer Sam, continued the wild live performances and recorded an album at Britannia Row with producer Tim Bran.

Career
Raygun toured Thailand, Singapore, Malaysia and The Philippines promoting the release of their debut album in South-East Asia.

On 15 August 2009, Raygun made history when it was featured alongside Kasabian, Hoobastank, Pixie Lott, Boys Like Girls and The All-American Rejects as one of the live acts at Asia's first MTV World Stage Live In Malaysia concert that was held in Malaysia.

The band supported Pink during the European leg of her 2009 Funhouse Tour. They have also supported Alphabeat, Paul Weller, The Script and Newton Faulkner and toured smaller venues as headliners later in 2009.

Their debut single "Just Because" was released on August 3, 2009. The video for "Just Because" was directed by Joseph Kahn, which features a high speed chase on the freeway. A flash game was also released to support the single.

Raygun was the supporting act for Peter Bjorn and John and Newton Faulkner at the iTunes live festival on 13 July 2009.

YouTube video
Channel 4's 4Play screened a 15-minute programme featuring the band.  A negative Guardian article by Rhodri Marsden saw the video receive numerous predominantly negative comments. The criticism of the video mainly focused on the clichéd sentiments from singer Ray Gun likening his band to "Iggy Pop, James Brown, David Bowie and Shirley Bassey in a lift".  He also claimed the album was "inspired by the perils of hedonism, when you go out and indulge too much and regret it the next day. Anything that you think is good for a while can end up being so harmful to yourself, whether it's love or sex or drugs or alcohol". Raygun later released a sarcastic apology for the whole debacle which they posted on their MySpace blog.

Discography
Raygun (29 January 2009)

Track listing

Demise and break-up
At the end of 2009, the band was dropped by Sony which consequently led to Ray Gun and The Adj deciding to go their separate ways. 

Sam and Ben are now playing for successful Scottish singer-songwriter Amy Macdonald and are currently touring with her. Ben also plays with X Factor star Olly Murs.

References

External links
 Full performances at MTV World Stage Live In Malaysia

RCA Records artists